The 2012 Utah Utes football team represented the University of Utah during the 2012 NCAA Division I FBS football season. The team was coached by eighth year head coach Kyle Whittingham and played their home games in Rice-Eccles Stadium in Salt Lake City, Utah. They were a member of the South Division of the Pac-12 Conference. They finished the season 5–7, 3–6 in Pac-12 play to finish in fifth place in the South Division.

Schedule

Before the season

Coaching changes
On February 2, 2012, Brian Johnson was promoted to offensive coordinator of the team.

Game summaries

Northern Colorado
Sources:

Utah leads series: 2 – 0

Utah handily shut out Northern Colorado 41–0 on John White's 119 yards rushing. Quarterback Jordan Wynn shook off an early interception to pass for 200 yards and 19 out of 27 completions. Northern Colorado only combined for 114 yards and never crossed midfield during the game.

Utah State
Sources:

Utah leads series: 77 – 28 – 4

BYU
Sources:

Utah leads series: 55 – 34 – 4

Arizona State
Sources:

Utah trails series: 6 – 17

USC
Sources:

Utah trails series: 3 – 7

UCLA

Sources:

Utah trails series: 2 – 8

#8 Oregon State

Utah trails series: 6 – 9 – 1

California

Utah trails series: 3 – 5

Utah senior running back Reggie Dunn set an NCAA record with two 100-yard kickoff
returns for touchdowns.

Washington State

Utah leads series: 6 – 5

Washington

Utah trails series: 0 – 7

Arizona

Utah leads series: 20 – 15 – 2

Colorado

Utah trails series: 24 – 31 – 3

References

Utah
Utah Utes football seasons
Utah Utes football